The 2016 FA Women's Cup Final was the 46th final of the FA Women's Cup, England's primary cup competition for women's football teams. The showpiece event was the 23rd to be played directly under the auspices of the Football Association (FA) and was named the SSE Women's FA Cup Final for sponsorship reasons. The final was contested between Arsenal Ladies and Chelsea Ladies on 14 May 2016 at Wembley Stadium in London. The match was the second FA Women's Cup Final to be held at Wembley.

Chelsea, managed by Emma Hayes, went into the match as defending champions, having won the 2015 FA Cup, while Arsenal, managed by Pedro Martínez Losa, had won the competition on thirteen previous occasions. But Chelsea were favourites to lift the trophy as Arsenal had enjoyed only moderate success since their victory at the 2014 Cup Final, and had been beaten by Chelsea in a match earlier in the 2016 season of the Women's Super League. Arsenal won the match 1–0, with a first-half goal from Danielle Carter scored in the eighteenth minute, and securing the team their fourteenth FA Cup victory. Carter was also named Player of the Match. The match was attended by a crowd of 32,912, an increase on the 30,710 who attended the 2015 final.

The match was refereed by Sarah Garratt of the Birmingham Football Association, whose appointment was announced by the Football Association on 5 May. The match saw Garratt taking charge of her first FA Cup Final.

Match

Details

References

Cup
Women's FA Cup finals
FA Women's Cup Final
FA Women's Cup Final
FA Women's Cup Final, 2016
FA Women's Cup Final, 2016